Altius Space Machines is a subsidiary company of Voyager Space Holdings (Jan 2020), based in Broomfield, CO dedicated to engineering the future in Aerospace.

Core Capabilities
Ideation, Conceptual Design, and Research and Development, Flight Hardware Manufacturing
System and Architecture Level Ideation and Design
Electropermanent Magnet (EPM)
Electrical/Mechanical/Robotics Systems
Cryogenic Fluid Systems
Space Environmental Testing Lab (TVAC, Vibe, HALT/HASS)

History

2010–2012 
In 2010, Altius Space Machines, with support from the SRI International invented the "Sticky Boom" Electroadhesive Boom-Rendezvous system to solve several of the key challenges associated with rendezvous and capture of the Orbiting Sample Canister (OSC) for a Mars Sample Return (MSR) mission. This system significantly improves on previously proposed sample canister capture systems, by providing the following key features:
High inherent safety — Contact and capture event takes place at a significant distance from the orbiter
Electromechanical steering for the last few meters  of the OS rendezvous and capture process – Reduces rendezvous propellant consumption
High tolerance for positioning and velocity errors between orbiter and target – Reduces requirements for precision control of orbiter during the capture maneuver.
Very low mass and volume compared to other solutions
The same system can capture the OS and transfer it to an Earth Entry Vehicle using the same hardware.
Provides a simple means of reliable, non-mechanical contact and proximity detection.
Low-risk solution—booms are based on systems with extensive flight experience, the capture device has seen extensive testing in a terrestrial environment as well as successful preliminary microgravity dynamic testing aboard a parabolic aircraft.
Small enough for affordable near-term testing in LEO using CubeSat or other rideshare opportunities.

In July 2011, Altius Space Machines won first place in the 2011 NewSpace Business Plan Competition in Silicon Valley, sponsored by the Space Frontier Foundation.

Altius won a contract with DARPA in July 2012 to build a composite extensible robotic boom arm for the DARPA Phoenix project.
They also began work in 2012 developing Gecko-adhesive grippers, as part of work to build a Gecko Gripper Touch-to-Grasp tool that incorporated JPL’s "synthetic Gecko adhesive technology that mimics the ability of Gecko lizards to adhere to walls." The work leveraged previous work done by Altius on uncooperative capture mechanisms using electroadhesion.

2013–2015 
In 2014, Altius began work on a MagnetoShell aerocapture and aerobraking technology for cubesats.  Called MIDAS, Multi-Purpose Interplanetary Deployable Aerocapture System, the 6U CubeSats will be designed to be used on an interplanetary mission such as to Mars, Venus, or Jupiter's moon Europa

Other work includes the "Kraken Asteroid Boulder Retrieval System." In late 2014, Altius expects to test prototypes of grasping arms and non-force-closure gripper concepts for capturing a boulder off the surface of an asteroid.  The study is funded by NASA as part of their broader Asteroid Redirect Mission (ARM) project and is intended to mature system concepts and key technologies while assessing the feasibility of potential commercial partnerships for ARM.

In 2015 Altius won a contract to build lightweight robotic manipulators, that utilize rollable composite STEM booms to provide a prismatic extension/retraction DOF, as robot arms for Assistive Free-Flyers (AFFs) on the International Space Station. These Low-Inertia STEM Arm (LISA) manipulators can provide comparable or better manipulation capabilities to AFFs than traditional robotic manipulators, but with less mass, lower inertia, better stowability, and the ability to reach into hard-to-access locations.:

2016–2018

2019-Present

Product Line

DogTag™ 

The DogTag™ is a universal grapple fixture that supports a wide variety of capture methods. :  Patent number: US 2019/0241286A1 
Mechanical Grasping

Snare Capture

Magnetic Capture

Gecko Adhesion

Electrostatic Adhesion

Chemical Adhesion

Harpoon Capture
Hundreds of units are currently in orbit with hundreds more scheduled to be launched fully space-qualified to stringent Airbus-OneWeb Satellites requirements.
OneWeb YouTube Video

Electropermanent Magnets (EPMs) 

An electropermanent magnets (EPM) Is an Altius Space Machines patented technology, which offer numerous benefits over existing mechanical or magnetic interfaces. EPMs are solid-state switchable magnets, with no moving parts and can be put into an unlimited number of form factors. Patent number: 10984936

Combines the best characteristics of both varieties to provide a desired magnetic field that:
Very strong grip – 500 kPa already demonstrated (72.5 psi), theoretically capable of up to 1 MPa (145 psi)
No power to maintain state, only to change state
Solid-state, no moving parts
Simple command and control
Available in dual-mode (Distance Attraction/Surface Grip/Off) or single-mode (On/Off)
Magnetic field is tightly constrained and does not create any significant magnetic flux beyond the passive-interface  
EPMs combine the tunability of electromagnets with the stability of permanent magnets to produce a uniquely capable magnetic latch with no moving parts

Dual-Mode EPM 
Altius is currently working to develop the Dual-Mode EPM. This EPM will have a "Long-Range Mode" (LRM) and a "Short-Range Mode" (SRM). The LRM will exert meaningful force at a distance of 5 cm, exert slight force at 10–20 cm, and Grip force at contact sufficient to prevent "bouncing off". SRM achieves grip pressure = 200 kPA.
 Patent Pending: 20210210267

EPM Based Products 
Altius has developed many products that contain EPM Technology and continues to invent new and innovative products to meet the needs of On-Orbit servicing.

MagTag™ 

Altius has developed a MagTag Modular Interface which allows for a new paradigm in spacecraft design, construction, and servicing: an EPM latched electrical and/or fluid connection interface. 
Robust: EPMs offer a strong (1 kN) magnetic connection with no moving parts
Lightweight & Low-profile: <500g total, each interface half can fit within a 10 x 10 x 5 cm envelope
Latching: EPMs only require power (<20J) to change gripping states from on-to-off and will maintain the latch without active power
Highly-Capable: The baseline design supports 600W of transferred power at 28V, and over 1Gbit/s data transfer rates
Launch Lock Capable: MagTags are strong enough to support multi-kg payloads during launch
Scalable: Arrays of MagTags on a pallet can support a variety of modules and sub-modules for installation

Magnetic Tool Changer 
 
 

Altius' Magnetic Tool Changer uses a solid-state switchable EPM magnetic latch and acts as a robotic end-effector. The robotic side connects to a tool side that can have a number of different tools (robotic or traditional). If the tool side is robotic, the tool changer can provide power and data to the tool and use it as if it were hard-wired.
Dust-Tolerant Hermetic Design: Designed without any exposed moving electrical or mechanical parts on either side of the interface.
High Reliability: Has no moving parts, dramatically increasing the reliability over traditional mechanical tool changers.
Low Actuation Power: Solid-state switchable magnet design has low peak power consumption (<5W if desired), only consuming power when the magnet is switching from on to off.
Lightweight/Compact: By eliminating the need for complex mechanical latching systems, the proposed tool changer can be dramatically lighter than traditional mechanical tool changers.
Tight Reach Capability: The compact EPM tool changer enables the insertion of sampling tools or sensors into much tighter geometric areas than would be possible with a turret or mechanical tool changer design.
Power and Data Transfer: The Tool Changer is capable of wireless power (inductive) and data transfer >100 watts and up to 870 Mbit/s. Data is transferred using Keyssa technology.

In-Space Docking & Assembly

ESCHER (example) 

Altius was selected under NASA's SBIR to develop the Experimental Swarm Construction Hardware EPM based Robotic interface (ESCHER) for NASA's In-Space Assembly (ISA) initiative of modular satellites and space facilities.

NASA Applications
In Space Assembly (ISA) of modular satellites and space facilities
Rapid assembly/disassembly structures enabling multi-robot missions for collaborative planetary exploration
Universal interface for swarm assemble-able orbital and planetary structures
Terrestrial Applications
Payload quick swap interface for hosted and replaceable payloads
UAV interface for docking, recharging, and payload manipulation.
Universal interface for robotic assembly/disassembly terrestrial structures in remote, harsh environments

Cryogenic Fluid Connector for In-Space Refueling 

Features:
Designed to re-use existing match-plate valve stems on launch vehicles
Zero mating force connection using solid-state electro-permanent magnets (EPMs)
Mating and blowoff forces reacted locally by a dedicated draw-down mechanism consisting of a linear servo array
Dual poppet for dry disconnect
Self aligning

Specifications:
Avg. Helium Leak Rate @ 50psi: 0.00001 cc/sec
Proof tested to 100psi hydrostatically
Flow coefficient (water): 4.9-5.3
Magnetic latch tested up to 1000N (force sensor limit)
Maximum latching force of 2135 N

Cryo-Coupler v2

Space-Rated Propellant Transfer Valve (PTV) 

Altius has developed an Electromechanically driven propellant transfer valve for the transfer of fluid or gas.
Contains a paired Active and Passive Assembly for a tolerant fluid coupling.

Active Assembly mass: <1.2 kg
Passive Assembly mass: <0.3 kg
MAWP: 725 PSI
Total Stroke: 1.75"
Tolerant of mechanical misalignment and thermal gradients

References 

Aerospace companies of the United States